María Alejandra Royo Díaz (born April 19, 2001) is a Panamanian beauty pageant titleholder who was crowned as Miss Teen Panama International 2019 and Miss Teen International 2020. She is the first Panamanian to win the Miss Teen International title.

Pageantry

Miss Teen Panamá 2019
She participated in the contest Miss Teen Panamá 2019 where she won the Miss Teen Panama International title.

Miss Teen International 2020

See also
Rodrigo Moreira

References

External links

2001 births
Living people
Panamanian beauty pageant winners
Panamanian female models